Circus Monkey is Taiwanese Mandopop artist Stanley Huang's 2nd Mandarin studio album. It was released on 12 January 2001 by EMI Music Taiwan.

Track listing
Help - 4:26
馬戲團猴子 (Ma Shi Tuan Hou Zi) - Circus Monkey - 4:03
心內有鬼 (Xin Nei You Gui) - Show Me Your Demons - 4:32
你裝酷，我想吐 (Ni Zhuang Ku, Wo Xiang Tu) - 3:07
一半的靈魂 (Yi Ban De Ling Hun) - 4:35
休假 (Xiu Jia) - 3:26
High的後遺症 (High De Hou Yi Zheng) - Effects of the High - 3:52
絕對無罪 (Jue Dui Wu Zui) - 4:32
我的樣子 (Wo De Yang Zi) - 3:49
不斷跳舞 (Bu Duan Tiao Wu) - 5:00

References

2001 albums
Stanley Huang albums